In telecommunications an aerial insert is a segment of cabling that rises from ground to a point above ground, followed by an overhead run, e.g. on poles, followed by a drop back into the ground. An aerial insert is used in places where it is not possible or practical to place a cable underground. Aerial inserts might be encountered in crossing deep ditches, canals, rivers, or subway lines.

See also
 Aerial cable

References

Telecommunications equipment
Local loop